Garmendia is the surname of a family of the Basque Country region of Guipuzcoa, in Spain. The surname means "wheat mountain" (gar 'wheat', mendi 'mountain'), after Garmendia de Iraurgui, later known as Salvatierra de Iraurgui, later the site of the cities of  Azpeitia and Azkoitia.

As almost every Basque family, Garmendia enjoys the status of hidalgo, of ancient origin, previous to the Reconquista. The coat of arms of some of its bearers is Argent, a boar sable, running away from a hunter, who injures it with a lance sable tipped azure, upon a hill vert with a tree vert.

Notable people sharing the surname Garmendia
Basil Spalding de Garmendia, American tennis player
Cristina Garmendia, Basque businesswoman and Science & Innovation Minister of Spain
Francisco Garmendia, American Catholic bishop
Germán Garmendia, Chilean YouTuber, comedian, and writer 
Ion Garmendia Anfurrutia, Basque musician
José Ignacio Garmendia, Basque footballer
Joseba Garmendia, Basque footballer
Luisa Garmendia, First Lady of Chile 1827 to 1829, wife of President Francisco Antonio Pinto
Nerea Garmendia, Basque actress and comedian
Salvador Garmendia, Venezuelan author

As a second or maternal surname 
Aníbal Pinto de Garmendia, President of Chile from 1876 to 1881
Augusto Pérez Garmendia, Spanish military officer
Enrique Molina Garmendia, Chilean philosopher
Enriqueta Pinto Garmendia, First Lady of Chile 1841–1846 and 1846–1851, wife of President Manuel Bulnes

Basque-language surnames
Spanish noble families
Surnames